Amphisbaena elbakyanae is a species of worm lizards found in Colombia.

The species was named in honor of Alexandra Elbakyan, creator of Sci-Hub. The authors cited "her colossal contributions for reducing the barriers in the way of science". The paper was published in an open access journal.

References

elbakyanae
Reptiles described in 2021
Endemic fauna of Colombia
Reptiles of Colombia